Živica may refer to:

Živica (Požarevac), village in the municipality of Požarevac, Serbia
Živica (Lučani), village in the municipality of Lučani, Serbia
Živica, Croatia, ghost town in Croatia